I100 may refer to:

 WIII (FM) (branded as "I-100"), a radio station serving Ithaca and Cortland, New York, United States
 WJTQ (formerly branded as "i100"), a radio station serving Pensacola, Florida and Mobile, Alabama, United States
 i100, a sister website of The Independent